Jon Sarkin (born 1953)  is a self-taught contemporary American artist.

Jon Sarkin is a prolific  artist who creates elaborate drawings and paintings filled with words and images, among other artistic endeavors. Sarkin has been painting for over 20 years.  His work has been featured in The New Yorker, The New York Times, ABC Primetime, This American Life, GQ, ARTnews, and galleries in New York City, Los Angeles, and around the world. He lives and works in Cape Ann, Massachusetts.

Early life
Born in 1953 in Newark, New Jersey, and raised in Hillside, New Jersey, Jon Sarkin is the middle child of Stanley Sarkin and Elaine Sarkin Zheutlin.  He graduated from the Pingry School in Elizabeth, New Jersey (since moved to Martinsville, New Jersey),  in 1971.   His father, a dentist in Elizabeth, New Jersey, died of a heart attack in 1972 at age 49.

In 1975, Jon graduated with a BA degree in Biology from The University of Pennsylvania, and received his MS degree in Environmental Science from Rutgers University in 1977.  He received his DC (Doctor of Chiropractic) from Palmer College of Chiropractic in 1980.  His older brother, Richard, was a pediatrician, while his younger sister, Jane, is Features Editor for Vanity Fair.  In 1982,  Jon opened a chiropractic office in South Hamilton, Massachusetts.  In 1986 he married Kim Richardson.

Transition to Artist
In 1988 at the age of 35, Sarkin suddenly developed tinnitus, a ringing in the ears caused by a blood vessel in his head pushing against an acoustic nerve, as well as hyperacusis, an over-sensitivity  to certain frequency ranges of sound.  In 1989, to alleviate the condition, he underwent surgery after which he suffered a cerebellar hemorrhage and  a subsequent stroke.  Sarkin awoke from the surgery deaf in one ear, his vision splintered, and his balance permanently skewed.  Neurologists told him his brain had been permanently changed through the surgery, with parts sliced and removed to alleviate the condition.  The neurons that were left had to make new connections and find new meaning.

As a result, it became increasingly difficult to maintain the semblance of his former life.  Sarkin became obsessed with drawing, but different from the kinds of focused sketches he had made before the stroke.  Instead of the visual jokes and puns he drew before, his new works were akin to distorted cartoon faces with symbols that sometimes overlapped the features, much like Jean Giraud's Moebius strips.  Influenced by comics and popular culture, the images kept coming, spilling out of some dark unknown place in his brain.

Professional Artist Career
Sarkin has been featured in Vanity Fair, ABC Medical Mysteries Discovery Channel Documentary “Tormented by Genius,” GQ, ARTnews, and the American Visionary Art Museum. In addition, he has been featured in Art New England, 2011.  Today, Jon's artwork typically sells in the $10,000 USD range or more.

Sarkin created the album art for the Guster album, Easy Wonderful, and he also created art for (and appears in) their music video/single "Do You Love Me?"  
Tom Cruise's production company optioned his life story for a movie, but the project was put on hold and has yet to be made.  In 2011, Pulitzer Prize winning author Amy Ellis Nutt wrote a book about Jon Sarkin, "Shadows Bright as Glass," for which she and Jon were interviewed by Terry Gross of NPR, Fresh Air.

On December 6, 2021 Sarkin signed an exclusive representation deal with the Henry Boxer Gallery, which has specialized in outsider and visionary art since the 1970s.

References

External links
Jon Sarkin's website
R. A. Traylor Gallery

American contemporary painters
1953 births
20th-century American painters
American male painters
21st-century American painters
Living people
American chiropractors
20th-century American male artists